Retinol-binding protein 3, interstitial (RBP3), also known as IRBP is a protein that in humans is encoded by the RBP3 gene.  RBP3 orthologs have been identified in most eutherians except tenrecs and armadillos.

Function 

The inter-photoreceptor retinoid-binding protein is a large glycoprotein known to bind retinoids and found primarily in the interphotoreceptor matrix of the retina between the retinal pigment epithelium and the photoreceptor cells. It is thought to transport retinoids between the retinal pigment epithelium and the photoreceptors, a critical role in the visual process.

Gene 

The human IRBP gene is approximately 9.5 kbp in length and consists of four exons separated by three introns. The introns are 1.6-1.9 kbp long. The gene is transcribed by photoreceptor and retinoblastoma cells into an approximately 4.3-kilobase mRNA that is translated and processed into a glycosylated protein of 135,000 Da.

Structure 

The amino acid sequence of human IRBP can be divided into four contiguous homology domains with 33-38% identity, suggesting a series of gene duplication events. In the gene, the boundaries of these domains are not defined by exon-intron junctions, as might have been expected. The first three homology domains and part of the fourth are all encoded by the first large exon, which is 3,180 base pairs long. The remainder of the fourth domain is encoded in the last three exons, which are 191, 143, and approximately 740 base pairs long, respectively.

Application 

The rbp3 gene is commonly used in animals as a nuclear DNA phylogenetic marker. The exon 1 has first been used in a pioneer study to provide evidence for monophyly of Chiroptera. Then, it has been used to infer the phylogeny of  placental mammal orders, and of the major clades of Rodentia, Macroscelidea, and Primates. RBP3 is also useful at lower taxonomic levels, e.g., in muroid rodents and Malagasy primates, at the phylogeography level in Geomys and Apodemus rodents, and even for carnivora species identification purposes.

Note that the RBP3 intron 1 has also been used to investigate the platyrrhine primates phylogenetics.

References

Further reading

External links 
  GeneReviews/NCBI/NIH/UW entry on Retinitis Pigmentosa Overview